Spelende kinderen (English: Playing Children) was a short Dutch silent film by M.H. Laddé from 1896. The film is lost.

See also
 List of Dutch films before 1910

Sources 
 A. Briels, Komst en plaats van de Levende Photographie op de kermis. Een filmhistorische verkenning, Assen (1973), p. 30
 K. Dibbets & F. van der Maden (red.), Geschiedenis van de Nederlandse film en bioscoop tot 1940, Weesp (1986), p. 19
 R. Smit (red.), Filmhistorie in Eindhoven : 1897–1985, Eindhoven (1985), p. 12
 H. Rijken, Filmgeschiedenis van Hoorn, Hoorn (1995)
 G. Donaldson, 'De eerste Nederlandse speelfilms en de gebroeders Mullens', in: Skrien Nr. 28, January 1972, p. 8

External links 
Spelende kinderen, EYE Film Institute Netherlands
 De eerste Nederlandse film: De gestoorde hengelaar, EYE Film Institute Netherlands

1896 films
Dutch black-and-white films
Dutch silent short films
Lost Dutch films
1890s lost films
1896 short films